Adam Huber (born May 8, 1987) is an American actor and model. He is known for playing Liam Ridley in the CW series Dynasty(2018-2022)

Early life
Born in Hollidaysburg, Pennsylvania, Huber graduated from Hollidaysburg Area High School in 2006 and studied Business Management at Pennsylvania State University. He began modeling in New York City in 2007.

Filmography

Film

Television

References

External links
 

1987 births
21st-century American male actors
American male film actors
American male television actors
Living people
Male actors from Pennsylvania
Male models from Pennsylvania
People from Hollidaysburg, Pennsylvania